Bitonto SS Medici is a railway station in Bitonto, Italy. The train services are operated by Ferrotramviaria.

Train services
The station is served by the following service(s):

Bari Metropolitan services (FR1) Bitonto - Palese - Bari
Bari Metropolitan services (FR2) Barletta - Andria - Bitonto - Aeroporto - Bari
Bari Metropolitan services (FM2) Bitonto - Aeroporto - Bari

References

Railway stations in Apulia
Railway station Santi Medici
Buildings and structures in the Province of Bari